Hermit Island can refer to:
 Hermit Island (Antarctic)
 Hermit Island (Maine)
 Hermit Island (Maryland) 
 Hermit Island (Wisconsin)
 Hermit Island, a tiny river island in the Smoke Hole Canyon of West Virginia, USA

See also
 Hermit Islands, Papua New Guinea
 Hermite Islands, Tierra del Fuego
 Hermite Island, one of the Montebello Islands, Australia